Kakamigahara Air and Space Museum is an aviation museum located in Kakamigahara in Gifu Prefecture in Japan. It is at Gifu Air Field of the Japan Air Self-Defense Force.

References

Museums in Gifu Prefecture
History museums in Japan
Aerospace museums in Japan
Military and war museums in Japan
Kakamigahara, Gifu